Senator Backus may refer to:

Franklin Thomas Backus (1813–1870), Ohio State Senate
Frederick F. Backus (1794–1858), New York State Senate
Henry T. Backus (1809–1877), Michigan State Senate
Jan Backus (born 1947), Vermont State Senate

See also
Spencer Bachus (born 1947), Alabama State Senate